Lac Pivabiska is a lake in Cochrane District in Northeastern Ontario, Canada. It is in the James Bay drainage basin and is the source of the Pivabiska River. It is officially known by the French name only.

The primary inflows are the Valentine River, arriving from Wolverine Lake, at the west; and the Pivabiska Narrows, arriving from Lac Ste. Thérèse, at the east. The primary outflow, at the northeast, is the Pivabiska River, which flows via the Missinaibi River and the Moose River to James Bay.

Tributaries
Pivabiska Narrows
Valentine River

See also
List of lakes in Ontario

References

Other map sources:

Lakes of Cochrane District